Mario Vandenbogaerde (born 1 June 1973) is a Belgian professional darts player who plays in the Professional Darts Corporation (PDC) events. He reached the semifinals of the 2020 BDO World Darts Championship.

Career
In 2005, Vandenbogaerde won the Belgium National Championships. In 2018, he won the Luxembourg Masters. In 2019, he won the German Open, before reaching the semi-finals of the World Masters.

In September 2019, he qualified for the 2020 BDO World Darts Championship, which turned out to be the event's last edition, as the 11th seed, and got to the semi-finals on debut. He was first Belgian man to reach the semi-finals of a World Championship and the only to do so at the BDO World Championship.

In January 2022, he competed in the Professional Darts Corporation's Q school and successfully secured a Tour card during the third day of its final phase.

World Championship results

BDO
 2020: Semi-finals (lost to Jim Williams 4–6)

Performance timeline 

PDC European Tour

References

External links
 

Living people
Belgian darts players
Professional Darts Corporation current tour card holders
1973 births